The 17th César Awards ceremony, presented by the Académie des Arts et Techniques du Cinéma, honoured the best French films of 1991 and took place on 22 February 1992 at the Palais des Congrès in Paris. The ceremony was chaired by Michèle Morgan and hosted by Frédéric Mitterrand. Tous les matins du monde won the award for Best Film.

Winners and nominees
The winners are highlighted in bold:

Best Film:Tous les matins du monde, directed by Alain CorneauMerci la vie, directed by Bertrand BlierLa Belle Noiseuse, directed by Jacques RivetteVan Gogh, directed by Maurice Pialat
Best Foreign Film:Toto le Héros, directed by Jaco Van DormaelAlice, directed by Woody AllenDances with Wolves, directed by Kevin CostnerThe Silence of the Lambs, directed by Jonathan DemmeThelma & Louise, directed by Ridley ScottUrga, directed by Nikita Mikhalkov
Best Debut:Delicatessen, directed by Marc Caro, Jean-Pierre JeunetLes Arcandiers, directed by Manuel SanchezL'Autre, directed by Bernard GiraudeauFortune Express, directed by Olivier SchatzkyLune froide, directed by Patrick Bouchitey
Best Actor:Jacques Dutronc, for Van GoghMichel Piccoli, for La Belle NoiseuseHippolyte Girardot, for Hors la vieJean-Pierre Marielle, for Tous les matins du mondeGérard Jugnot, for Une époque formidable...
Best Actress:Jeanne Moreau, for La vieille qui marchait dans la merAnouk Grinberg, for Merci la vieJuliette Binoche, for Les Amants du Pont-NeufEmmanuelle Béart, for La Belle NoiseuseIrène Jacob, for La Double vie de Véronique
Best Supporting Actor:Jean Carmet, for Merci la vieJean-Claude Dreyfus, for DelicatessenTicky Holgado, for Une époque formidable...Bernard Le Coq, for Van GoghGérard Séty, for Van Gogh
Best Supporting Actress:Anne Brochet, for Tous les matins du mondeCatherine Jacob, for Merci la vieJane Birkin, for La Belle NoiseuseHélène Vincent, for J'embrasse pasValérie Lemercier, for L'Opération Corned-Beef
Most Promising Actor:Manuel Blanc, for J'embrasse pasLaurent Grévill, for L'Année de l'éveilThomas Langmann, for Paris s'éveilleGuillaume Depardieu, for Tous les matins du mondeChick Ortega, for Une époque formidable...
Most Promising Actress:Géraldine Pailhas, for La Neige et le feuMarie-Laure Dougnac, for Delicatessen Marie Gillain, for Mon père, ce hérosAlexandra London, for Van GoghElsa Zylberstein, for Van Gogh
Best Director:Alain Corneau, for Tous les matins du mondeBertrand Blier, for Merci la vieJacques Rivette, for La Belle NoiseuseAndré Téchiné, for J'embrasse pasMaurice Pialat, for Van Gogh
Best Writing:Gilles Adrien, Marc Caro, Jean-Pierre Jeunet, for DelicatessenBertrand Blier, for Merci la vieAlain Corneau, Pascal Quignard, for Tous les matins du mondeMaurice Pialat, for Van Gogh
Best Cinematography:Yves Angelo, for Tous les matins du mondeDarius Khondji, for DelicatessenGilles Henry, Emmanuel Machuel, for Van Gogh
Best Costume Design:Corinne Jorry, for Tous les matins du mondeValérie Pozzo di Borgo, for DelicatessenÉdith Vesperini, for Van Gogh
Best Sound:Anne Le Campion, Pierre Gamet, Gérard Lamps, Pierre Verany, for Tous les matins du mondeVincent Arnardi, Jérôme Thiault, for Delicatessen Jean-Pierre Duret, François Groult, for Van Gogh
Best Editing:Hervé Schneid, for DelicatessenClaudine Merlin, for Merci la vieMarie-Josèphe Yoyotte, for Tous les matins du monde
Best Music:Jordi Savall, for Tous les matins du mondeCarlos D'Alessio, for DelicatessenZbigniew Preisner, for La Double vie de VéroniqueJean-Claude Petit, for Mayrig
Best Production Design:Jean-Philippe Carp, Miljen Kreka Kljakovic, for DelicatessenMichel Vandestien, for Les Amants du Pont-NeufPhilippe Pallut, Katia Wyszkop, for Van Gogh
Best Animated Short:J'entends plus la guitare, directed by Bernard PalaciosLa Saga des glaises, directed by David Ferre, Olivier Théry-Lapiney
Best Fiction Short:25 décembre 58, 10h36, directed by Diane Bertrand
Best Documentary Short:Hermann Heinzel, ornithologue, directed by Jacques Mitsch
Honorary César:Michèle MorganSylvester Stallone

See also
 64th Academy Awards
 45th British Academy Film Awards

External links
 Official website
 
 17th César Awards at AlloCiné

1992
1992 film awards
Cesar